Lohariandava is a village and commune in the Brickaville district (or: Vohibinany (district)) in the Atsinanana Region, Madagascar.

It is located near on the banks of the Vohitra river. This town can be accessed only by train.

References

Cities in Madagascar
Populated places in Atsinanana